Fossilized affixes abound in Austronesian languages.

Formosan languages
Li and Tsuchida (2009) lists various fossilized reflexes of Proto-Austronesian infixes *-al-, *-aR-, and *-aN- in all major Formosan languages as well as Tagalog and Javanese. These infixes are not productive in any modern Austronesian language. Their meanings remain elusive, although Li and Tsuchida suggest that *-aN- might mean 'having the sound or quality of', as evidenced in Paiwan and Puyuma. Reid (1994) hypothesizes the meaning of *-aR- to be 'distributive, plural'.

The following table is from Li and Tsuchida (2009:358).

Bikol language
Malcolm Mintz (1992) analyzed fossilized affixes from Marcos de Lisboa's Vocabulario de la lengua bicol, which was compiled between 1609 and 1613. The Marcos de Lisboa dictionary contains many archaic forms of Bikol no longer found in modern spoken Naga Bikol.

a-
aN-
ali(N)-, li-, ari(N)-
alu-, aru-
ati-
ba-, baN-, -al-
ba- + ali(N)-, balik-
hiN-
mu-, pu-, -um-
sa-, sa- + ali(N)-, saN-
taga-, tagu-
ta-, taN-
so-, no-
-imin-

*kali/qali word forms
According to Blust (2001, 2009), the fossilized morpheme *kali ~ *qali is used in various Austronesian languages to designate objects having a "sensitive connection with the spirit world."

References

 Blust, Robert A. 2001. "Historical morphology and the spirit world: *qali/kali-prefixes in Austronesian languages." In John Bradshaw and Kenneth L. Rehg (eds.) Issues in Austronesian Morphology. A festschrift for Byron W. Bender. Canberra: Pacific Linguistics, 15–73.
 Blust, Robert A. 2009. The Austronesian Languages. Canberra: Pacific Linguistics, Research School of Pacific and Asian Studies, Australian National University. , .
Li, Paul Jen-kuei and Shigeru Tsuchida. 2009. "Yet more Proto Austronesian infixes." Discovering history through language: papers in honour of Malcolm Ross, 345–362. Canberra: Pacific Linguistics.
Mintz, Malcolm W. 1992. "The fossilised affixes of Bikol." Currents in Pacific linguistics: papers on Austronesian languages and ethnolinguistics in honour of George W. Grace, 265–291. Canberra: Pacific Linguistics.

External links
Tagalog *kali/qali words
Affixes in Formosan languages

Linguistic morphology
Austronesian languages